The Dazemard River is a tributary of the east bank of the Wetetnagami River flowing into Senneterre in the RCM of La Vallée-de-l'Or Regional County Municipality, in the administrative region of Abitibi-Témiscamingue, in Quebec, in Canada.

This river crosses successively (from the upstream) the cantons of Souart, Moquin and Effiat.

Forestry is the main economic activity of the sector; recreational tourism activities, second.

The Dazemard River Valley is served by the R1015 Forest Road (North-South direction) passing west of the Wetetnagami River Valley; this road joins the road R1051 towards the North (East-West direction).

The surface of the Dazemard River is usually frozen from early November to mid-May, however, safe ice circulation is generally from mid-November to mid-April.

Geography

Toponymy 
At different times in history, this territory has been occupied by the Attikameks, Algonquins and Cree. The term "Dazemard" is a family name of French origin.

The toponym "Dazemard River" was made official on December 5, 1968, at the Commission de toponymie du Québec, when it was created.

See also

References

External links 

Rivers of Abitibi-Témiscamingue
Nottaway River drainage basin